James Cockie (died 1573) was a goldsmith in Edinburgh. He helped mint coins in Edinburgh Castle during the Marian Civil War and was hanged as a counterfeiter on 3 August 1573.

The surname was also spelled "Cokie" and "Cokkie", "Cokke", or "Cok". The family were prominent in Edinburgh as goldsmiths. He was born around 1535, and his father was also called James Cockie.

Career
James Cockie and James Mosman were made free men of the Edinburgh incorporation of goldsmiths on 1 May 1557. In 1558 he made and engraved a clock case for Mary of Guise and also worked in Edinburgh castle casting a cannon called a "double falcon" with the Queen's arms and motto.

Cockie married a daughter of John Arres. She was a sister of the wife of James Mosman, Marion Arres. By his marriage Mosman obtained the house on Edinburgh's High Street now known as the John Knox House.

At the Scottish Reformation, in 1560 he gave evidence to Henri Cleutin and Jacques de la Brosse against the Protestant Lords of the Congregation. They described him as a maker and engraver of coins. According to his sworn statement the Earl of Arran had ordered him to come to his lodging and requested that he engrave a signet or seal matrix with the arms of Mary, Queen of Scots and Francis II of France and irons for making coins. Cockie refused at first, alleging that he was not used to this kind of work, and also would need an order from the Queen Regent, Mary of Guise. He subsequently worked on a die for a coins with a crown and the motto "Verbum Dei." When the Congregation left Edinburgh he gave the dies to John Acheson, a worker in the mint.

Cockie and Mossman joined William Kirkcaldy of Grange in Edinburgh Castle on 11 May 1571. They had chosen to support Kirkcaldy who held the castle for Mary, Queen of Scots during the Marian Civil War.

Mossman and Cockie helped Kirkcaldy pledge the queen's jewels, which had been stored in the castle, for loans. Cockie, as archival evidence shows, was particularly involved in receiving silver and minting coins in the castle. The coins minted in the castle were finer than those minted at Dalkeith by the opposition. The types included the eighty pence piece or half merk, known as a "six and eight." In June 1572 the English soldier and Marshall of Berwick William Drury sent one of Cockie's half merks to William Cecil as a novelty.

After the castle fell, Cockie, James Mossman, William Kirkcaldy of Grange, and his brother James Kirkcaldy were hanged on 3 August 1573. Their heads were displayed on the castle walls.

James Cockie and James Kirkcaldy were tried together at Holyrood House before the executions.

Robert Lindsay of Pitscottie, the author of a chronicle, mentioned that he minted coins in Edinburgh castle, "ane that struik the cunzie callit Cok".

A family of goldsmiths
In 1581 his son, also a goldsmith, also named James Cockie was restored to his inheritance by the Parliament of Scotland.

William Cockie or Cokky, goldsmith, had a house in the Canongate at the "lapley stone". The house burnt down in 1608 when his son, Archibald Cockie was living there.

The Earl of Mar's ewer
The National Museums of Scotland has a jug or ewer made of rock crystal with silver-gilt mounts which are thought to be the work of James Cockie and his workshop. The ewer mounts were made in Edinburgh in the reign of Mary, Queen of Scots and the lid was engraved with the heraldry of John Erskine and Annabell Murray, Countess of Mar. Erskine became Earl of Mar in 1565. The Deacon of the Goldsmiths who assayed the silver work was George Heriot.

Another ewer of silver or tortoise-shell with silver mounts, said to have been a gift to the Earl of Mar from Queen Elizabeth at the time of the baptism of James VI, was destroyed in the fire at Alloa in August 1801. Elizabeth also gave him a silver and mother of pearl basin and laver during his embassy to London in 1601 when the secret correspondence was arranged. These objects are sometimes confused with the crystal ewer.

A silver cup made by Henry Thomson used at Forgue has Cockie's assay mark as Deacon in 1563. The cup was presented to the church in 1633 by James Crichton of Frendraught.

References

External links
 Ewer associated with John Erskine, Earl of Mar, National Museums of Scotland, Q.L.1987.13

1573 deaths
Businesspeople from Edinburgh
Coins of Scotland
People executed by the Kingdom of Scotland by hanging
Scottish goldsmiths
Scottish counterfeiters
People of the Scottish Marian Civil War
Material culture of royal courts
Collections of the National Museums of Scotland